Pink Creek is a stream in the U.S. state of Georgia. It is a tributary to the Chattahoochie River.

The name Pink Creek most likely is a corruption of "Punk Creek", so named after the Indian settlement of "Punk Knot" along its course.

References

Rivers of Georgia (U.S. state)
Rivers of Carroll County, Georgia
Rivers of Heard County, Georgia